Leopoldo Martínez (born 12 June 1943) is a Mexican former sports shooter. He competed in the 50 metre pistol event at the 1968 Summer Olympics.

References

1943 births
Living people
Mexican male sport shooters
Olympic shooters of Mexico
Shooters at the 1968 Summer Olympics
People from Tlalpujahua
Pan American Games medalists in shooting
Pan American Games bronze medalists for Mexico
Shooters at the 1967 Pan American Games
20th-century Mexican people